Elpis Global Education Inc. is a company that operates Elpis Academy (a learning centre) and Elpis College (a private high school).

Elpis College 
Elpis College is an accredited private school in the Province of Ontario since 2007 and offers credit courses based on the Ontario Ministry of Education curriculum. The school has two campuses: Missisauga Campus (BSID #881900) and North York Campus (BSID #884452).

Administrative Staff 
 David Jinman Kim, PhD, Principal
 Esther Kim, Counsellor
 Christine Hernandez, Counsellor and Administrative Assistant

Competitions
Students from the organization have participated and placed in national math competitions run by the Centre for Education in Mathematics and Computing and science competitions.

External links
 Elpis Global Education Inc. website
 Elpis College website
 Elpis Academy website

Private schools in Ontario
Educational institutions established in 2002
2002 establishments in Ontario